The 2017–18 Gonzaga Bulldogs women's basketball team represents Gonzaga University in the 2017–18 NCAA Division I women's basketball season. The Bulldogs (also informally referred to as the "Zags"), are members of the West Coast Conference. The Bulldogs, led by fourth year head coach Lisa Fortier, play their home games at the McCarthey Athletic Center on the university campus in Spokane, Washington. They finished the season 27–6, 17–1 in WCC play to win the WCC regular season. They defeat Pepperdine, San Francisco and San Diego to become champions of the WCC women's basketball tournament to earn an automatic trip to the NCAA women's tournament where they lost in the first round to Stanford.

Previous season
They finished the season 26–7, 14–4 in WCC play to win the WCC regular season. They defeat Pacific, San Francisco and Saint Mary's to become champions of the WCC women's basketball tournament to earn an automatic trip to the NCAA women's tournament where they were defeated by Oklahoma in the first round.

Roster

Schedule

|-
!colspan=9 style=| Exhibition

|-
!colspan=9 style=| Non-conference regular season

|-
!colspan=9 style=| WCC regular season

|-
!colspan=9 style=| WCC Women's Tournament

|-
!colspan=9 style=| NCAA Women's Tournament

Rankings
2017–18 NCAA Division I women's basketball rankings

See also
2017–18 Gonzaga Bulldogs men's basketball team

References

Gonzaga
Gonzaga Bulldogs women's basketball seasons
Gonzaga
Gonzaga
Gonzaga